Rhaphiinae is a subfamily of flies in the family Dolichopodidae.

Genera 
Haplopharyngomyia Meuffels & Grootaert, 1999 (subfamily incertae sedis)
Nematoproctus Loew, 1857 (Diaphorinae or Rhaphiinae)
Ngirhaphium Evenhuis & Grootaert, 2002
Physopyga Grootaert & Meuffels, 1990
Rhaphium Meigen, 1803
Urodolichus Lamb, 1922 (Diaphorinae or Rhaphiinae)

References 

 
Dolichopodidae subfamilies